Thermohydrogenium is an anaerobic and thermophilic  bacterial genus from the family of Syntrophomonadaceae with one known species (Thermohydrogenium kirishiense).

References

Eubacteriales
Bacteria genera
Monotypic bacteria genera